In computer programming, the single-serving visitor pattern is a design pattern. Its intent is to optimise the implementation of a visitor that is allocated, used only once, and then deleted (which is the case of most visitors).

Applicability 

The single-serving visitor pattern should be used when visitors do not need to remain in memory. This is often the case when visiting a hierarchy of objects (such as when the visitor pattern is used together with the composite pattern) to perform a single task on it, for example counting the number of cameras in a 3D scene.

The regular visitor pattern should be used when the visitor must remain in memory. This occurs when the visitor is configured with a number of parameters that must be kept in memory for a later use of the visitor (for example, for storing the rendering options of a 3D scene renderer).

However, if there should be only one instance of such a visitor in a whole program, it can be a good idea to implement it both as a single-serving visitor and as a singleton. In doing so, it is ensured that the single-serving visitor can be called later with its parameters unchanged (in this particular case "single-serving visitor" is an abuse of language since the visitor can be used several times).

Usage examples

The single-serving visitor is called through the intermediate of static methods.

 Without parameters: Element* elem;
 SingleServingVisitor::apply_to(elem);
 With parameters: Element* elem;
 TYPE param1, param2;
 SingleServingVisitor::apply_to(elem, param1, param2);
 Implementation as a singleton: Element* elem;
 TYPE param1, param2;
 SingleServingVisitor::set_param1(param1);
 SingleServingVisitor::set_param2(param2);
 SingleServingVisitor::apply_to(elem);

Consequences

Pros
 No "zombie" objects. With a single-serving visitor, it is ensured that visitors are allocated when needed and destroyed once useless.
 A simpler interface than visitor. The visitor is created, used and free by the sole call of the apply_to static method.

Cons
 Repeated allocation. At each call of the apply_to method, a single-serving visitor is created then discarded, which is time-consuming. In contrast, the singleton only performs one allocation.

Implementation (in C++)

Basic implementation (without parameters) 

// Declaration
class Element;
class ElementA;
class ElementB;
class SingleServingVisitor;

... // Same as with the [[visitor pattern]].

// Definition
class SingleServingVisitor {
protected:
    SingleServingVisitor();
public:
    ~SingleServingVisitor();

    static void apply_to(Element*);
    virtual void visit_ElementA(ElementA*) = 0;
    virtual void visit_ElementB(ElementB*) = 0;
}

// Implementation
void SingleServingVisitor::apply_to(Element* elem) 
{
    SingleServingVisitor ssv;
    elem.accept(ssv);
}

Passing parameters

If the single-serving visitor has to be initialised, the parameters have to be passed through the static method:

void SingleServingVisitor::apply_to(Element* elem, TYPE param1, TYPE param2, ...) 
{
    SingleServingVisitor ssv(param1, param2, ...);
    elem.accept(&ssv);
}

Implementation as a singleton

This implementation ensures:
 that there is at most one instance of the single-serving visitor
 that the visitor can be accessed later

// Definition
class SingleServingVisitor {
protected:
    static SingleServingVisitor* instance_;
    TYPE param1_;
    TYPE param2_;

    SingleServingVisitor();

    static SingleServingVisitor* get_instance();
    // Note: get_instance method does not need to be public

public:
    ~SingleServingVisitor();

    static void apply_to(Element*);

    // static methods to access parameters
    static void set_param1(TYPE);
    static void set_param2(TYPE);

    virtual void visit_ElementA(ElementA*) = 0;
    virtual void visit_ElementB(ElementB*) = 0;
}

// Implementation
SingleServingVisitor* SingleServingVisitor::instance_ = NULL;

SingleServingVisitor* SingleServingVisitor::get_instance() 
{
    if (this->instance_ == NULL)
        this->instance_ = new SingleServingVisitor();
    return this->instance_;
}

void SingleServingVisitor::apply_to(Element* elem) 
{
    elem->accept(get_instance());
}

void SingleServingVisitor::set_param1(TYPE param1) 
{
    getInstance()->param1_ = param1;
}

void SingleServingVisitor::set_param2(TYPE param2) 
{
    getInstance()->param2_ = param2;
}

Related patterns

 Visitor pattern, from which this pattern derives
 Composite pattern: single-serving visitor is often applied to hierarchies of elements
 Singleton pattern

Software design patterns
Articles with example C++ code